Krzhizhanovsky is a Russian surname derived from Polish Krzyżanowski. Notable persons with that name include:

 Gleb Krzhizhanovsky (1872–1959), Soviet economist
 Sigizmund Krzhizhanovsky (1887–1950), Russian short-story writer

See also
 Krzyżanowski, original Polish spelling of the surname

Surnames of Russian origin